Vincenzo Torrente (born 12 February 1966) is an Italian football coach and former defender, currently working as head coach of  club Padova.

Playing career
After starting his career at minor league club Nocerina, Torrente joined Genoa at the age of 19. He quickly became a mainstay for the club, spending 15 consecutive seasons with the Rossoblu at both Serie A and Serie B level, playing also at European level during the Osvaldo Bagnoli period in the early 1990s. He left Genoa in 2000, after having collected more than 400 games with the club, in order to join Alessandria, where he ended his career in 2011 at the age of 35.

Coaching career
After retirement, Torrente became a coach and promptly returned to Genoa, heading the Allievi Nazionali (under-17 youth squad). Later in 2002 he was appointed as caretaker coach together with Rino Lavezzini in what turned out to be a troublesome season that ultimately ended in relegation (then annulled due to the so-called Caso Catania) for the club. He then returned working as youth coach for Genoa until 2009, when his former boss Luigi Simoni offered him a head coaching post at Lega Pro Seconda Divisione club Gubbio. Under his two-year tenure, Gubbio achieved a surprising feat of two consecutive promotions, thus reaching Serie B in June 2011 as league champions. In June 2011 he left Gubbio to become new head coach at Bari, again at Serie B level.

On 13 December 2018, he signed with Serie C club Sicula Leonzio. He left Sicula Leonzio at the end of the 2018–19 season.

On 16 October 2019, he returned to the club he had the most success with, Gubbio, now in the Serie C. After three positive seasons in charge of Gubbio, on 17 June 2022 the club terminated Torrente's contract.

On 13 December 2022, Torrente was hired as the new head coach of Serie C club Padova.

References

External links

1966 births
Living people
Sportspeople from the Province of Salerno
Italian footballers
Association football defenders
Serie A players
Serie B players
A.S.G. Nocerina players
Genoa C.F.C. players
U.S. Alessandria Calcio 1912 players
Italian football managers
Genoa C.F.C. managers
S.S.C. Bari managers
U.S. Cremonese managers
Calcio Padova managers
Serie B managers
Serie C managers
Footballers from Campania